The 2010 Intercontinental Le Mans Cup was the inaugural running of the Automobile Club de l'Ouest's (ACO) Intercontinental Le Mans Cup, an international auto racing championship for manufacturers and teams.  The Cup featured endurance races from the American Le Mans Series, Le Mans Series, and Asian Le Mans Series, as well as teams representing each of the three series.  Winning teams were awarded with automatic invitations to the 2011 24 Hours of Le Mans.  As with the three racing series based on Le Mans, the Intercontinental Cup featured the ACO's four premiere classes: LMP1, LMP2, GT1, and GT2.  Six manufacturers and eighteen teams vied for the Cup in each of the four classes utilized in Le Mans racing.

Race calendar and event results
The debut year of the Intercontinental Cup featured three events in the autumn. It consisted of the final rounds of the American Le Mans Series and Le Mans Series, as well as the sole event on the Asian Le Mans Series schedule.  The opening round in September featured the 1000 km of Silverstone at the Silverstone Circuit in Great Britain, followed by a 1000-mile race for the Petit Le Mans at Road Atlanta in the United States in October.  The final event, the 1000 km of Zhuhai, was the first Le Mans-style competition in China, held at the Zhuhai International Circuit in November.

Note that for each individual race, cars not competing in the Intercontinental Cup may have won their respective class.  However, only the highest finishing Cup entrant is listed below.

Overall winners in bold.

Championship awards
The points scale for the championship included all individual race participants who completed 70% of the winner's distance, although points were only awarded to designated entries in the Intercontinental Cup.  A bonus point was also available if an ILMC team scored pole position for an event.

Manufacturers Cups
Manufacturer Cups were available only to designated manufacturers in the LMP1 and GT2 categories.  Each manufacturer had to designate teams to represent them at each event, with points being allocated by combining the top two finishing representatives.

LMP1
Peugeot won all three races for LMP1 cars thanks to the victories of Team Peugeot Total, defeating their only rivals Audi for the manufacturers' championship.

(key) (Races in bold indicate pole position) (Races in italics indicate fastest lap)

GT2
GT2 was the only other class to have two championships, with Ferrari edging out Porsche for the manufacturers' championship by seven points, taking two wins to Porsche's one.

(key) (Races in bold indicate pole position) (Races in italics indicate fastest lap)

Team Cups

LMP1
Team Peugeot Total claimed the Teams Cup, finishing 17 points clear of Audi Sport Team Joest, while Drayson Racing and Team Oreca Matmut also contested races.

(key) (Races in bold indicate pole position) (Races in italics indicate fastest lap)

LMP2
The LMP2 team cup was settled comprehensively, as OAK Racing were the only team to compete in all three LMP2 races.

(key) (Races in bold indicate pole position) (Races in italics indicate fastest lap)

GT1
In the GT1 category, entries were received from Larbre Compétition and Atlas eFX-Team FS, but Atlas withdrew from all three ILMC events, automatically earning Larbre the title.

(key) (Races in bold indicate pole position) (Races in italics indicate fastest lap)

GT2
Porsche team Felbermayr-Proton upheld some honour for the marque, as they won the teams' championship despite not winning a race, fifteen points ahead of AF Corse, who won at Silverstone. Risi Competizione and BMW Team Schnitzer won the other races to be held.

(key) (Races in bold indicate pole position) (Races in italics indicate fastest lap)

Footnotes

References

External links
 Intercontinental Le Mans Cup

Intercontinental Le Mans Cup
Intercontinental Le Mans Cup